Ebnat-Kappel railway station is a railway station in Ebnat-Kappel, in the Swiss canton of St. Gallen. It is an intermediate station on the Bodensee–Toggenburg railway and is served by local trains only.

Services 
Ebnat-Kappel is served by the S2 of the St. Gallen S-Bahn:

 : hourly service over the Bodensee–Toggenburg railway between Nesslau-Neu St. Johann and Altstätten SG.

References

External links 
 
 Ebnat-Kappel station on SBB

Railway stations in the canton of St. Gallen
Südostbahn stations